Journal Squared, or J2, is a 3-tower retail and residential complex under construction at Journal Square in Jersey City, New Jersey  Upon completion, the complex will consist of buildings of 54, 60, and 70 stories, among the tallest buildings in the state.

Site
The site of the project is adjacent to the Journal Square Transportation Center on Summit Avenue across from the Hudson County Administration Building, the county seat of Hudson County and the Newkirk House, the oldest extant building in the county.

Funding and abatements
Journal Squared is project of Kushner Real Estate Group. It was first approved by the city council in December 2012 and was later granted a 30-year tax abatement and $10 million in bonds.

Design 

The project was designed by Handel Architects and Hollwich Kushner. The project consists of three towers, and a mix of office, residential, and retail, although the project will be chiefly residential, with 2,000 new units. One of the main components is a large plaza occupying a portion of the lot, providing a focal point for public gathering and open space in an area that is rapidly becoming densely populated. As development pressures continue to rise, Jersey City should continue gaining substantial verticality.

Construction
The project broke ground in October 2014 with the first building topping out in December 2015 at 54 stories and 574 ft (175 m). Once completed, Journal Squared will include the some of tallest buildings in the city. Construction began on the second and tallest of the three towers in 2018. The second tower topped-out in December 2019. The third tower, consisting of 600 units and rising 60 stories, broke ground in October 2021. The buildout of all three phases is scheduled to be completed in Spring 2024.

See also 

 Hilltop, Jersey City
 List of tallest buildings in Jersey City
 1 Journal Square

References

Residential skyscrapers in Jersey City, New Jersey
Skyscrapers in Jersey City, New Jersey